Jeff Weninger is an American politician and a former Republican member of the Arizona House of Representatives representing District 17 from 2015 to 2023. Before serving in the legislature, Weninger served on the Chandler City Council for eight years and held the position of Vice Mayor. He was a candidate for State Treasurer of Arizona in the 2022 election, but lost the primary to incumbent Treasurer Kimberly Yee.

Elections
 2014 – Weninger and J.D. Mesnard defeated Danielle Lee on November 4. Weninger received 32,297 votes

References

External links
 Official page  at the Arizona State Legislature
 Campaign site

Place of birth missing (living people)
Year of birth missing (living people)
Living people
Republican Party members of the Arizona House of Representatives
Arizona city council members
People from Chandler, Arizona
21st-century American politicians